Ladislas Lozano (born 24 June 1952 as Ladislao Lozano Léon) is a French-Spanish football coach and retired player. He is most remembered for guiding amateur team Calais RUFC to the Coupe de France Final 2000.

Managerial career
On 22 January 2011, Lozano signed a six-month contract with Algerian club CA Bordj Bou Arreridj. However, he resigned from his position just a month later.

On 19 June 2013, Lozano agreed a deal to become the new head coach of the newly promoted Qatar Stars League outfit Muaither SC. Prior to being named Muaither's coach, he formerly had coaching stints at several clubs in Qatar, including Al-Khor, Al-Rayyan and Al-Saliya.

Honours
 Finalist of the Coupe de France 1999–2000 with Calais RUFC.
 Winner of the Sheikh Jasim Cup with Al-Khor Sports Club

References

External links
 Ladislas Lozano -MEMO l'humanité
 
 

1952 births
Living people
Association football forwards
French footballers
French people of Spanish descent
Racing de Santander players
SC Abbeville players
Amiens SC players
French football managers
US Créteil-Lusitanos managers
Wydad AC managers
Stade de Reims managers
Calais RUFC managers
Al-Sailiya SC managers
Al-Khor SC managers
Expatriate football managers in Morocco
Expatriate football managers in Qatar
Expatriate football managers in Algeria
Expatriate football managers in Tunisia
French expatriate sportspeople in Algeria
Botola managers